You TV was an analog television channel available in Sri Lanka owned by the private company MGM Networks (Pvt) Ltd. It is currently running test transmissions while its sister radio channel, Max Radio, has already begun proper transmissions.

Programming
You TV started its operations as Max Television. At their time of launch, the channel featured programs from NDTV 24x7. You TV nowadays features programs from France 24.

External links
 Blog dedicated to TV and Radio related events in Sri Lanka

English-language television stations in Sri Lanka
Sinhala-language television stations
Tamil-language television stations in Sri Lanka
Television channels and stations established in 2007